Alexander Moore Phillips (1907–1991) was an American short story writer and novelist.  He also worked as a topographical draftsman for a title insurance company.  Phillips served in the U. S. Army from April, 1942 spending time in Egypt and Palestine.  His short stories appeared in pulp magazines including Amazing Stories, Wonder Stories and Unknown,.  His novel, The Mislaid Charm, was published by Prime Press in 1947.  He served as president of the Philadelphia Science Fiction Society.

Notes

References

External links

1907 births
1991 deaths
20th-century American novelists
American science fiction writers
American male novelists
American fantasy writers
Writers from Philadelphia
American male short story writers
20th-century American short story writers
20th-century American male writers
Novelists from Pennsylvania
American military personnel of World War II